Tenkinsky District is an administrative district (raion), one of the eight in Magadan Oblast, Russia. As a municipal division, it is incorporated as Tenkinsky Urban Okrug. Its administrative center is the urban locality (an urban-type settlement) of Ust-Omchug. As of the 2010 Census, the total population of the district was 5,422, with the population of Ust-Omchug accounting for 72.2% of that number.

Geography
The district is named after the Tenka River and is located in the southwest of Magadan Oblast. The Arman and Bakhapcha have their sources in the district. It borders Susumansky and Yagodninsky Districts in the north, Khasynsky District in the east, Olsky District in the south, and Khabarovsk Krai in the west.

History
The district was established on December 2, 1953.

Administrative and municipal status
Within the framework of administrative divisions, Tenkinsky District is one of the eight in the oblast. The urban locality (an urban-type settlement) of Ust-Omchug serves as its administrative center.

As a municipal division, the district has been incorporated as Tenkinsky Urban Okrug since May 1, 2015. Prior to that date, the district was incorporated as Tenkinsky Municipal District, which was subdivided into one urban settlement and three rural settlements.

References

Notes

Sources

Districts of Magadan Oblast
States and territories established in 1953